Nána is a village and municipality in the Nové Zámky District in the Nitra Region of south-west Slovakia, near the border with Hungary.

History
In historical records the village was first mentioned in 1157. It was the ancient estate of the Nánabeszter kindred in the 13th-century Hungary.

Geography
The municipality lies at an elevation of 110 metres (360 ft) and covers an area of 17.947 km² (6.929 mi²).

Demographics
In 2011, the municipality had a population of 1223 people. 70% of the population identified as Hungarian and 24% as Slovak. It has a small Romani minority.

Facilities
The village has a small public library and a football pitch.

References

External links
http://www.statistics.sk/mosmis/eng/run.html
 Nána – Nové Zámky Okolie

Villages and municipalities in Nové Zámky District